Francis Patrick Carney (September 20, 1846 – May 4, 1902) was an Irish-American politician who served as the 10th Lieutenant Governor of Colorado. He was a member of the Populist party and served from 1899 to 1901 under Governor Charles Spalding Thomas.

Early life 
He was born September 20, 1846, in County Fermanagh, Ireland. His family emigrated to New York City in 1859 and moved to Ouray, Colorado in 1877.

Career 
He became a mason and worked as a contractor and miner as well as an organizer of labor unions. He served as member of the Colorado General Assembly from 1893 to 1895 and Colorado Senate from 1895 to 1899. Carney served as the 10th Lieutenant Governor of Colorado from 1899 to 1901.

Death 
He died May 4, 1902, in Ouray, Colorado.

References

Members of the Colorado House of Representatives
Colorado state senators
Lieutenant Governors of Colorado
People's Party (United States) elected officials
Colorado Populists
1846 births
1902 deaths
People from County Fermanagh
People from Ouray, Colorado
Irish emigrants to the United States (before 1923)
19th-century American politicians